Oskar Perron (7 May 1880 – 22 February 1975) was a German mathematician.

He was a professor at the University of Heidelberg from 1914 to 1922 and at the University of Munich from 1922 to 1951.  He made numerous contributions to differential equations and partial differential equations, including the Perron method to solve the Dirichlet problem for elliptic partial differential equations. He wrote an encyclopedic book on continued fractions Die Lehre von den Kettenbrüchen. He introduced Perron's paradox to illustrate the danger of assuming that the solution of an optimization problem exists:

Let N be the largest positive integer. If N > 1, then N2 > N, contradicting the definition of N. Hence N = 1.

Works
 Über die Drehung eines starren Körpers um seinen Schwerpunkt bei Wirkung äußerer Kräfte, Diss. München 1902
 Grundlagen für eine Theorie der Jacobischen Kettenbruchalgorithmus, Habilitationsschrift Leipzig 1906
 Die Lehre von den Kettenbrüchen, 2 vols., 1913, 3rd edn. Teubner Verlag 1954 (vol. 1 Elementare Kettenbrüche, vol. 2 analytische und funktionentheoretische Kettenbrüche)
 Irrationalzahlen, 1921, 2nd edn. 1939, 4th edn. de Gruyter, Berlin 1960
 Algebra I, II, Sammlung Göschen 1927, 3rd edn, 1951
 with Evelyn Frank: 
 Nichteuklidische Elementargeometrie der Ebene, Teubner, Stuttgart 1962

Sources
 Edmund Hlawka: Das Werk Perrons auf dem Gebiete der diophantischen Approximationen. Jahresbericht der DMV 80, 1978, S. 1–12
 Josef Heinhold: Oskar Perron, Jahresbericht der DMV 90, 1988, S. 184–199 (in der DML Bielefeld)
 Freddy Litten: Oskar Perron – Ein Beispiel von Zivilcourage im Dritten Reich, Mitteilungen der DMV Heft 3, 1994, S. 11–12; erweitert in: Frankenthal einst und jetzt, 1995, S. 26–28 (auf der Homepage von Litten)
 Leon Bernstein: The modified algorithm of Jacobi-Perron. Memoirs of the AMS 67, Providence, 1966
 Leon Bernstein: The Jacobi-Perron algorithm - its theory and application. Lecture Notes Math. 207, Springer-Verlag, 1971

See also 
Analytic hierarchy process
Keller's conjecture
Stieltjes transformation

References

External links
 
 
 
 Gabriele Dörflinger: Oskar Perron. In: Historia Mathematica Heidelbergensis.

1880 births
1975 deaths
20th-century German mathematicians
Academic staff of Heidelberg University
Academic staff of the Ludwig Maximilian University of Munich
PDE theorists
Linear algebraists